National Medical Commission (NMC) is an Indian regulatory body of 33 members which regulates medical education and medical professionals. It replaced the Medical Council of India on 25 September 2020. The Commission grants recognition of medical qualifications, gives accreditation to medical schools, grants registration to medical practitioners, and monitors medical practice and assesses the medical infrastructure in India.

It was earlier established for 6 months by an ordinance in January 2019 and later became a permanent law passed by Parliament of India and later approved by President of India on 8 August 2019.

History 

The NITI Aayog recommended the replacement of Medical Council of India (MCI) with National Medical Commission (NMC). The NMC bill was passed by parliament and approved by President on 8 August 2019.

National Medical Commission ordinance was brought in to replace Medical Council of India in early 2019 through an ordinance issued in January, 2019 by the President of India.

The Supreme Court had allowed the Central Government to replace the medical council and with the help of five specialized doctors monitor the medical education system in India, from July 2017.

The planning commission recommended the replacement of Medical Council of India (MCI) with National Medical Commission (NMC). The decision was approved by most states and after its approval by the Prime Minister Narendra Modi it was to be proposed as final bill in the parliamentary sessions by the Minister of health and family welfare Dr. Harsh Vardhan. It was passed by both houses of Parliament in 2019. President of India approved the National Medical Commission Bill 2019 on 8 August 2019 and it became a law.

Guidelines for foreign medical graduates 
In 2021, the NMC revised its guidelines for foreign medical graduates (FMGs) seeking to obtain a license to practice medicine in the country. The guidelines introduced changes and updates, including the expansion of recognition of medical qualifications from certain countries and the requirement for FMGs to pass the Screening Test for Foreign Medical Graduates (FMGE).

In order to be recognized as qualified to practice medicine in India, FMGs must be in possession of a valid medical qualification from a recognized medical institution and to have passed the FMGE, a mandatory examination that measures the knowledge and skills of FMGs in various areas of medicine.

The process for obtaining a license to practice medicine in India under the new guidelines involves several steps, including applying for recognition of the medical qualification with the NMC, registering with the Medical Council of India (MCI), and applying to take the FMGE. Upon passing the FMGE, FMGs can then apply for a license to practice medicine in India with the NMC.

Boards

The commission consists of four autonomous boards:

 Under-Graduate Medical Education Board (UGMEB),
 Post-Graduate Medical Education Board (PGMEB), 
 Medical Assessment and Rating Board and 
 Ethics and Medical Registration Board

Composition
 
The NMC consists of 33 members, including: 
 
a) a Chairperson (medical professionals only)
 
b) 10 ex officio Members:
 
 The President of the Under-Graduate Medical Education Board.
 The President of the Post-Graduate Medical Education Board.
 The President of the Medical Assessment and Rating Board.
 The President of the Ethics and Medical Registration Board.
 The Director General of Health Services, Directorate General of Health Services, New Delhi.
 The Director General, Indian Council of Medical Research.
 Director of any of the All India Institutes of Medical Sciences.
 Two persons from amongst the Directors of Postgraduate Institute of Medical Education and Research, Jawaharlal Institute of Postgraduate Medical Education and Research, Tata Memorial Hospital, North Eastern Indira Gandhi Regional Institute of Health and Medical Sciences, and All India Institute of Hygiene and Public Health.
 One person to represent the Ministry of Health and Family Welfare.
 
c) 22 Part-time Members:
 
 Three Members appointed from amongst persons who have special knowledge and professional experience in such areas including management, law, medical ethics, health research, consumer or patient rights advocacy, science and technology and economics.
 Ten members appointed on rotational basis from amongst the nominees of the states/union territories in the Medical Advisory Council.
 Nine members appointed from amongst the nominees of the States and Union territories in the  Medical Advisory Council.
 
Of these at least 60% of the members must be medical practitioners.

See also

 Rehabilitation Council of India
 Dental Council of India
 Indian Nursing Council
 National Commission for Allied and Healthcare Professions
 Pharmacy Council of India
 Medical Council of India
 All India Institute of Medical Sciences
 Indian Council of Medical Research
 Compulsory Rotating Medical Internship
 National Testing Agency
 University Grants Commission

References

External links
Official website
NMC Act 2019
New NMC guidelines for Foreign Medical Graduate 2021

Medical education in India
Regulatory agencies of India
Medical regulation in India
College accreditors in India
Organisations based in Delhi
Health law in India
Ministry of Health and Family Welfare
2020 establishments in Delhi
Government agencies established in 2020